András Gergely (23 May 1946 – 3 May 2021) was a Hungarian historian and diplomat. He was the Hungarian ambassador to the Netherlands.

References

1946 births
2021 deaths
20th-century Hungarian historians
Hungarian diplomats
Ambassadors of Hungary to the Netherlands
Recipients of the Order of Merit of the Republic of Hungary
Eötvös Loránd University alumni
People from Sopron